Divya Agarwal is an Indian actress, model and dancer known for participating in several reality shows. She is the runner-up of MTV Splitsvilla 10 and winner of Ace of Space 1 and Bigg Boss OTT. She made her acting debut with the horror web series Ragini MMS: Returns 2.

Background and early career 
Agarwal got her master's degree in journalism. She trained in dance from Terence Lewis Dance Academy, and then opened her own dance academy called Elevate Dance Institute. She has choreographed several actresses like Ileana D'Cruz, Sunny Leone and Shilpa Shetty. In 2010, she and a Pakistani choreographer worked on choreography for the IPL 2010.

She had also participated in several beauty pageants. In 2015, she won the title of "Miss Navi Mumbai". In 2016, she was crowned the winner of the Indian Princess pageant She also won Miss Tourism India International.

Career 
Agarwal rose to fame in 2017 when she participated in MTV India's Splitsvilla 10 wherein she finished as the runner-up with Priyank Sharma.

In 2018, she would act as a mentor in MTV India's Date To Remember show. In March 2018, Agarwal and Splitsvilla 10 contestant Baseer Ali guest co-hosted an episode of On Road With Roadies. In October, she participated in MTV India's Ace of Space 1 where she emerged as the winner.

In January 2019, Agarwal starred in her first international project by participating in Travel With A Goat, broadcast on Insight TV, where she and television celebrity chef Dean Edwards travel across Bulgaria with a sheep and must decide whether to have it slaughtered or save its life. In February 2019, she made a cameo appearance in Alt Balaji's web drama Puncch Beat. In March, Agarwal and Varun Sood participated as Roadies Insiders for Roadies: Real Heroes, broadcast on Voot. Next, she hosted Voot's Voot Night Live with RJ Anmol. In December, she starred opposite Sood to play Ragini/Savitri Devi in season 2 of Alt Balaji's horror web series Ragini MMS: Returns. In 2020, Agarwal and Sood co-hosted the Ace of Space spinoff MTV Ace the Quarantine.

In 2021, Agarwal participated in Voot's Bigg Boss OTT and emerged as the winner. She also portrayed a mysterious make-up artist character named Grissy in the action-drama web series Cartel.

Personal life 
In 2017, She met actor and model Priyank Sharma on MTV Splitsvilla 10 where they were both runners-up. They were dating post Splitsvilla and Agarwal entered Bigg Boss 11 to part ways with Sharma.

In 2018, she met actor and former MTV Roadies contestant Varun Sood. They worked together on Roadies: Real Heroes and MTV Ace of Space. Following Ace of Space, she and Sood confirmed they are dating. On 6 March 2022, she announced on social media that they had split.

On 28 October 2020, Agarwal's father died due to complications from COVID-19.

On 4 December 2022, she got engaged to Apurva Padgaonkar, a businessman and restaurateur, when he proposed her on her birthday party.

Media perception
Agarwal was listed sixth among Times of Indias Top 20 Most Desirable Women On Indian Television List in 2019, and nineteenth in 2020.

Filmography

Films

Television

Web series

Music videos

References

External links

 
 
 

1992 births
Living people
Participants in Indian reality television series
Indian women television presenters
Indian beauty pageant winners
Indian female dancers
Indian dance teachers
Actresses from Mumbai
Bigg Boss (Hindi TV series) contestants